Ralph Metcalf is a North Dakota Democratic-NPL Party member of the North Dakota House of Representatives, representing the 24th district since 1999.

External links
North Dakota Legislative Assembly – Representative Ralph Metcalf official ND Senate website
Project Vote Smart – Representative Ralph Metcalf (ND) profile
Follow the Money – Ralph Metcalf
2006 2004 2000 1998 campaign contributions
North Dakota Democratic-NPL Party – Representative Ralph Metcalf profile

Members of the North Dakota House of Representatives
Living people
Place of birth missing (living people)
Year of birth missing (living people)